"Let Go" is the third single by the American Christian rock band Red on their debut full-length studio album End of Silence. The song was written by Rob Graves, Jasen Rauch and Jason McArthur.

According to Red, the song is about "conquering the temptations – even addictions – that often control and eat away at us."

Track listing

Charts

References

2006 songs
Songs written by Rob Graves
Songs written by Jasen Rauch
Essential Records (Christian) singles
2007 singles
Red (American band) songs
Songs written by Jason McArthur